The 2020–21 Chooks-to-Go Pilipinas 3x3 season is the second season of the Chooks-to-Go Pilipinas 3x3 basketball league. It is also its first season as a professional league.

Originally set to start in January 2020, the season was postponed due to the COVID-19 pandemic and was tentatively set to run from September and until in February 2021. Three conferences are planned with 12 teams participating in each tournament. However only one conference – the President's Cup in October 2020 was held.

Venue
The Inspire Sports Academy in Calamba, Laguna serve as the sole venue of the league for the 2020-21 season. Players and staff will be confined in a bubble or isolation zone in Calamba for the duration of at least the President's Cup.

As early as August 2020, participating teams has been practicing at the University of the Philippines Epsilon Chi Gym in Quezon City.

Teams
The following teams has confirmed their participation for this season.

Bacolod Master Sardines
Bicol Paxful SMDC
Butuan City Uling Roasters
Nueva Ecija Rice Vanguards
Palayan City Capitals
Pagadian City–Rocky Sports
Pasig–Sta. Lucia Realtors
Petra Cement–Roxas City ZN Rockies
Big Boss Cement–Porac MSC Green Gorillas
Sarangani Marlins
Family's Brand Sardines-Zamboanga City
Zamboanga Peninsula Valientes MLV

Preseason tournament
A preseason tournament was held on October 19, 2020 at the Inspire Sports Academy. The preseason was won by Family's Brand Sardines-Zamboanga City which won 21–17 over Bacolod–Masters Sardines in the finals. The Nueva Ecija Rice Vanguards placed third.

2020 President's Cup
The 2020 President's Cup is ran from October 21 to 30, 2020 and consisted of five legs. For the President's Cup, a financial incentive was given to teams that faced face Family's Brand Sardines-Zamboanga City Chooks, which consist of players of the Philippine national team, in the finals of each leg as preparation of the national team for the 2020 Summer Olympics qualifiers, although Zamboanga City had to have to earn a place in finals in all legs.

Zamboanga City won the 2020 President's Cup by winning four of five legs including the grand finals.

Leg winners

References

Chooks-to-Go Pilipinas 3x3
2020–21 in Philippine basketball leagues
Chooks-to-Go Pilipinas 3x3